Nicolino is a surname. Notable people with the surname include:

Fabrice Nicolino (born 1955), French journalist
Justin Nicolino (born 1991), American baseball pitcher
Venus Nicolino (born 1972), American media personality, author, and doctor of clinical psychology

See also
Nicolò Grimaldi